Andy Murray defeated the two-time defending champion Rafael Nadal in the final, 6–3, 6–2 to win the men's singles tennis title at the 2015 Madrid Open. It was his second title in as many weeks.

Seeds
The top eight seeds receive a bye into the second round.

Draw

Finals

Top half

Section 1

Section 2

Bottom half

Section 3

Section 4

Qualifying

Seeds

Qualifiers

Lucky loser
  João Sousa

Qualifying draw

First qualifier

Second qualifier

Third qualifier

Fourth qualifier

Fifth qualifier

Sixth qualifier

Seventh qualifier

References
 Main Draw
 Qualifying Draw

Men's Singles